UC YMO: Ultimate Collection of Yellow Magic Orchestra is a compilation album by Yellow Magic Orchestra. The songs were selected by keyboardist and pianist Ryuichi Sakamoto. The album was also released as a premium edition. The premium edition came with a long-sleeved white shirt emblazed with the yMo logo as well as a yMo bandana that the band wore on the 1980 world tour 'From Tokio to Tokyo', along with a special Liner Notes Booklet and an autographed print by drummer and sometimes singer, Yukihiro Takahashi. It was cataloged as MHCL 291-4 and sold in Japan for 21,000 yen.

Track listing
All tracks arranged by YMO, except "Hirake Kokoro －Jiseiki－" by YMO & Kenji Omura and "Behind the Mask (Seiko Quartz CM Version)" by Ryuichi Sakamoto.

Digital Release 

On October 20, 2017, a 30-track digital version of the compilation was released to streaming services. This version omits track 16 from CD 1 (the stereo version of "Hirake Kokoro") as well as tracks 6, 16, 17 and 18 from CD 2 ("Lover Come Back To Me", "M-16", "Pocketful Of Rainbows" and the Seiko Quartz CM Version of "Behind The Mask").

Personnel
 Haruomi Hosono - Bass guitar, Synthesizer/Synth Bass, Keyboards, Drum machines, Samplers, Electronics, Sequencer, Marimba, Vocals
 Ryuichi Sakamoto - Keyboards, Electric piano, Synthesizer, Vocoder, Drum machines, Samplers, Electronics, Percussion, Vocals
 Yukihiro Takahashi - Drums, Electronic drums, Cymbals, Drum machines, Samplers, Percussion, Vocals
 Hideki Matsutake - Modular synthesizers, Sequencer, Programming
 Chris Mosdell - Lyrics, Vocals on "Citizens of Science"
 Masayoshi Takanaka - Guitar on "La Femme Chinoise"
 Tomoko Nunoi (née Ebe) - Sexy Voice (Vocals) on "La Femme Chinoise"
 Makoto Ayukawa - Guitar on "Solid State Survivor"
 Akiko Yano - Keyboards & Vocals on "Radio Junk"
 Moichi Kuwahara - Voice on "Jingle “Y.M.O.”"
 Kenji Omura - Guitar on "Nice Age", "Tighten Up", "Citizens of Science" & "Hirake Kokoro －Jiseiki－"
 Sandii - Vocals on "Nice Age"
 Mika Fukui - Voice on "Nice Age"
 Katsuya Kobayashi - Voice on "Tighten Up"
 Masato Ibu - Voice on "Tighten Up" & "The End of Asia"
 Peter Barakan - Lyrics
 Mari Nakamoto - Vocals on "Lover, Come Back to Me"
 Takashi Matsumoto - Lyrics
 Bill Nelson - Guitar on "Chaos Panic", "Ongaku", "Lotus Love", "Kai-Koh" & "Kageki na Shujuko"
 Takeshi Fujii & Akihiko Yamazoe - Technical Assistance on "Kimi ni, Mune Kyun.", "Chaos Panic", "Ongaku", "Lotus Love", "Kai-Koh", "Kageki na Shujuko", "The Madmen", "You've Got to Help Yourself", "Perspective" & "M-16"
 Regency - Doo-wop on "Pocketful of Rainbows"

References

Yellow Magic Orchestra albums
2003 compilation albums